The National Cryptologic Center (CCN) is a Spanish intelligence agency within the National Intelligence Center responsible for  cryptanalyzing and deciphering by manual procedures, electronic media and cryptophony, as well as to carry out technological-cryptographic investigations and to train the personnel specialized in cryptology. The CCN is legally regulated by Royal Decree 421/2004, of March 12.

From CCN depends:
 CCN-CERT. An expert group that handles computer security incidents.
 Certification body. A body responsible for certify if the Information and communications technology systems are secure.

Functions
The functions of the CCN are:
 Develop and disseminate standards, instructions, guides and recommendations to ensure the security of information and communication technology systems of the State Administration.
 Train the personnel of the administration specialized in the field of the security of the systems of the information and communications through the CCN-CERT.
 To constitute the Certification Body of the National Scheme of Evaluation and Certification of the Security of Information Technologies.
 Assess and accredit the ability of cipher products and IT systems to process, store or transmit information securely.
 Coordinate the acquisition and development of security technology.
 Protect classified information.
 Establish relationships with similar bodies in other countries.

Director
The director of CCN is the same as the director of the CNI, Félix Sanz Roldán. However, the competency of the center's management relapse in a deputy director supported by an assistant deputy director. The functions of the deputy director of the CCN are:
 Ensure compliance with the functions entrusted to the CCN.
 Certifies the security of information technologies and cryptology.
 Ensure the protection of classified information relating to information and telecommunications systems.

Agreements
The CCN has signed two important agreements with Microsoft in order to join the Government Security Program (GSP):
 The first of them in 2004, when an agreement was signed to access the Windows source code, with Microsoft's central servers in the United States.
 The second one in 2006, quite similar, aimed at obtaining access to the source Microsoft Office.

See also
 Centro Nacional de Inteligencia
 Spanish Intelligence Community

References

2004 establishments in Spain
Government agencies established in 2004
Spanish intelligence agencies
Government agencies of Spain